MacGruder and Loud is an American crime drama from Aaron Spelling Productions that aired on ABC from January 20 to April 30, 1985.

Premise 
The series stars John Getz and Kathryn Harrold as married police officers Malcolm MacGruder and Jenny Loud in a Los Angeles Police Department-styled police agency (where strict anti-fraternization policies were in effect). They fought a battle every day to keep it a closely guarded secret from their boss, Sgt. Hanson (played by veteran actor Lee de Broux).

Malcolm and Jenny lived in a duplex-type apartment complex where there was a secret door behind the grandfather clock in her apartment, where Malcolm could sneak in and enjoy her company.

Cast
John Getz as Det. Malcolm MacGruder
Kathryn Harrold as Det. Jenny Loud MacGruder
Ted Ross as Det. Sgt. Debbin
Frank McCarthy as Sgt. Myhrum

Episodes

Production 
This was one of the few failures from Aaron Spelling's production company in its history, since it was picked by ABC to debut right after the Super Bowl in 1985 and was heavily promoted  during the game. The promotion resulted in high ratings at first, but the series was cancelled three months into its run. The ratings decline was blamed on ABC's repeated changing of the show's timeslot before settling on Monday nights at 10:00 p.m., known as "the graveyard slot". It ranked 36th out of 77 shows with a 14.9 rating and a 23 share.

Because of the frequent commercials during the Super Bowl, the following night Johnny Carson asked rhetorically during his monologue on The Tonight Show, "Did you see that new show, 'Frequent and Loud'?"

The series was rushed into production by ABC in order to capitalize on the popularity of another crime drama at that time, Cagney and Lacey (which aired on CBS).

References

External links

1985 American television series debuts
1985 American television series endings
Television series by CBS Studios
Television series by Spelling Television
American Broadcasting Company original programming
Super Bowl lead-out shows
1980s American crime drama television series
1980s American police procedural television series
English-language television shows
Television duos
Television series about marriage
Television shows set in Los Angeles